The 1952 UCI Track Cycling World Championships were the World Championship for track cycling. They took place in Paris, France from 26 to 31 August 1952. Five events for men were contested, 3 for professionals and 2 for amateurs.

Medal summary

Medal table

See also
 1952 UCI Road World Championships

References

Track cycling
UCI Track Cycling World Championships by year
International cycle races hosted by France
Uci
1952 in track cycling
August 1952 sports events in Europe
1952 in Paris